This is a list of Acts of the Parliament of Malaysia. The list includes all principal Acts enacted after 1969 and pre-1969 statutes that were revised by the Commissioner of Law Revision under the authority of the Revision of Laws Act 1968.

List

See also 

 List of Acts of Parliament in Malaysia by citation number

External links
 Laws of Malaysia - Numerical Table of Laws
 Official Portal of e-Federal Gazette
 List of Post-2011 Principal Acts
 List of Post-2011 Amending Acts
 List of Post-2011 P.U. (A)
 List of Post-2011 P.U. (B)
 Attorney General of Malaysia: Laws of Malaysia - Alphabetical Table of Laws (up to Act 655)

Malaysian federal legislation
Parliament of Malaysia
Malaysia
Malaysia law-related lists
Malaysia